aUI is a philosophical, a priori language created in the 1950s by W. John Weilgart, Ph.D. (March 9, 1913 – January 26, 1981; born Johann Wolfgang Weixlgärtner, and also known as John W. Weilgart) a philosopher and psychoanalyst originally from Vienna, Austria.  He described it as "the Language of Space", connoting universal communication, and published the fourth edition of the textbook in 1979; a philosophic description of each semantic element of the language was published in 1975.

As an effort toward world "peace through understanding", it was Weilgart's goal to clarify and simplify communication. Ultimately, it was his experiment in facilitating more conscious thinking in that it is built from a proposed set of primitive, possibly universal elements that are designed to reflect a motivated, mnemonic relationship between symbol, sound, and meaning. In his psychotherapy work, he sometimes used client-created aUI formulations to reveal possible subconscious associations to problematic concepts. aUI can also be considered an experiment in applied cognitive lexical semantics, and Weilgart claimed it could serve as an auxiliary language.

Characteristics 
aUI is built upon a set of proposed universal semantic primes or elements of meaning that are combined – analogous to the atomic elements of the periodic table – to create ‘molecules of meaning.’ Each ‘element of meaning’ is represented by both a morpheme and a phoneme, all of which are motivated by their intuitive relationship to reality. Weilgart found these fundamental concepts to be at such a basic level that they likely could not be defined by any simpler concepts. Linguistically speaking, aUI attempts 'oligosynthesis' in which words are synthesized or composed from a minimal number of total morphemes or units of meaning. The motivated relationship between morphology, phonology, and semantics means that if words look and sound similar, they also have similar meanings; homophonous words become synonymous.

aUI has 31 morpheme-phonemes each with an associated meaning, i.e. each morpheme = a phoneme = a sememe.

Characters 

Additionally, short nasal vowels (marked with an asterisk) are used for numerals:

Each phoneme also has an ideographic glyph or symbol that represents its meaning. The symbol for "human",  is depicted by the two legs or arms of the human being, also suggesting his dichotomous nature. The "human" may be fulfilled by the whole triangular trinity of "spirit", a 'deep, mysterious' , (there are many possible trinities found in philosophy and religion). "Life", represented by the shape of a leaf, is photosynthesis forming the basis of life on Earth. "Feeling",  is a heart shape, blood pressure and pulse reflecting various feelings, and "action", a 'vibrant' , is represented by a lightning bolt, the most active phenomenon in nature.

Examples

History and theory 
Weilgart followed Gottfried Leibniz' proposal for an alphabet of human thought that would provide a universal way to analyze ideas by breaking them down into their component pieces—to be represented by a unique "real" character. In the early 18th century, Leibniz outlined his characteristica universalis, the basic elements of which would be pictographic characters representing a limited number of elementary concepts. René Descartes suggested that a lexicon of a universal language should consist of primitive elements. The history of this language philosophy is delineated in Umberto Eco's The Search for the Perfect Language.

As a young man, Weilgart observed the pervasive and insidious effects of state planned Nazi propaganda. In particular, he was struck by how double meanings, together with similar sounds in slogans often associated unrelated words into suggestive "stereotyped formulas", [that would] "arrest the attention and appeal to the hearts of the national masses" (Hitler, Mein Kampf, 1925). For example, in one of the most repeated political slogans, Ein Volk, Ein Reich, Ein Führer! ("One people, One empire, One leader!") the word Volk sounds similar to folgt, meaning to follow or obey; Reich also means rich; so the phrase points to a subliminal association: that the populace obeys and follows their leader, who leads them to a wealthy empire. ("Das Volk folgt dem Führer"). Blu-Bo from Blut und Boden (Blood and Soil) was also a key slogan of Nazi ideology, as well as of course Heil Hitler! (Hail Hitler! - heil also meaning heal, salvation, safe, well).

Based on research in semantic conditioning from the 1950s, Weilgart theorized that whereas the conscious mind links synonyms (similar meanings), the subconscious mind associates assonance (similar sounds). That is, while we think about and distinguish similar-sounding words by their different meanings, we nonetheless feel, especially under stressed or 'crowd think' conditions, that at some level they are (or ought to be) also related in meaning. Alliterative slogans may suggest a link in words unrelated by meaning but related by common sounds. Weilgart posited that such slogans could function as triggers under desperate and incendiary conditions. Further, he believed that the general discrepancy between homophonous and synonymous words in conventional language would add to the disconnect with the subconscious mind.

Encoding and Fonts 

aUI is currently included in the unofficial ConScript Unicode Registry (CSUR), which assigns code points in the Private Use Area. aUI code points are mapped to the range U+E270 to U+E28F.

The eight “Aux” variant fonts of Kurinto (Kurinto Text Aux, Book Aux, Sans Aux, etc.) support aUI.

See also

 Victor Klemperer and his book LTI – Lingua Tertii Imperii

References

External links
 Official aUI website; under construction
 Libert, Alan (2000), A Priori Artificial Languages, Lincom Europa, Munich. 
 The "Language of Space" — critical commentary (however, not fully factual)

Engineered languages
Constructed languages introduced in 1962
Constructed languages